Magiun of Topoloveni is a traditional Romanian food based on plum which has received since 2011 a Protected Geographical Status from the European Union. Magiun of Topoloveni is a kind of jam made from very ripe fruit from various plum varieties without added sugar. It is from the town of Topoloveni in the Argeș County.

History 
The recipe of magiun of Topoloveni is attested since 1914.

The magiun of Topoloveni is produced exclusively in the area bounded by the municipalities of Boțarcani, Crințești, Gorănești, Inuri, Goleștii Badii, Țigănești, Topoloveni and Vițichești. This region, particularly suitable for growing plums, belongs to the Argeș County in the region of Wallachia. The pruneraies cover about 17,000 hectares.

The magiun became the first Romanian certified natural product and protected by European Union by order No. 338/2011 dated April 7, 2011 the European Commission has recognized a protected designation of origin and protected geographical indication in Magiun of Topoloveni.

In 2003, Romania has deployed troops in Afghanistan, as a member of NATO. In 2009, 100% natural magiun of Topoloveni replaced marmalade in all NATO bases. In 2010, the factory of Topoloveni was appointed official supplier to the Romanian Royal House.

Etymology 
The word magiun come from Turkish language macun which means "spread".

Preparation 
For the recipe of magiun of Topoloveni, have to four different types of plums, then cooked for 10 hours without sugar, with very low heat until the magiun sticks to the spoon.
The magiun of Topoloveni is a thick paste and homogeneous, dark brown, with dry matter content is a minimum of 55%. This concentration, which corresponds to 55° Brix, ensures the preservation of the product, at a temperature of 20° Celsius maximum, without the addition of any additives.

Plums used for the production of magiun of Topoloveni belong to various local varieties of Prunus domestica : Boambe of Leordeni, Bistriteana, Brumarii, Centenar, Dimbovita, Grasa ameliorata, Grasa Romanesca, Pescarus, Pitestean, Silvia, Stanley, Tomnatici Caran Sebes, Tuleu fat, Tuleu timpuriu, Valcean, Vinata Romaneasca.

References

Romanian sweets
Romanian products with protected designation of origin
Plum dishes